The West Clear Creek Wilderness is a 15,238-acre (6,167 ha) wilderness area in the U.S. state of Arizona. West Clear Creek is formed by the junction of Willow Creek and Clover Creek in the Mogollon Rim, which is part of the Colorado Plateau; the Mogollon Rim is the major part of the Arizona transition zone at the southwest of the Colorado Plateau of Utah-Colorado, Arizona-New Mexico.  Located east of Camp Verde, the area is part of Coconino National Forest. Common activities in West Clear Creek are swimming, camping, backpacking, hunting, fishing, and hiking.  A variety of plants and animals can be found year-round, along with extremely cold water.

See also
 Wilderness Act
 List of U.S. Wilderness Areas
 List of Arizona Wilderness Areas

External links

 National Forest Service: West Clear Creek
 West Clear Creek Wilderness @ Wilderness.net
 HikeArizona.com – West Clear Creek Trail #17
 Todd's Hiking Guide:West Clear Creek
 Arizona Boating Locations Facilities Map
 Arizona Lake Levels
 Video of West Clear Creek

Mogollon Rim
Protected areas of Coconino County, Arizona
Protected areas of Yavapai County, Arizona
Wilderness areas of Arizona
Canyons and gorges of Arizona
Coconino National Forest
Landforms of Coconino County, Arizona
Landforms of Yavapai County, Arizona
Protected areas established in 1984
1984 establishments in Arizona